Goose Hollow is a neighborhood in southwest Portland, Oregon, United States. It acquired its distinctive name through early residents' practice of letting their geese run free in Tanner Creek Gulch and near the wooded ravine in the Tualatin Mountains known as the Tanner Creek Canyon. Tanner Creek Gulch was a 20-block-long,  gulch (or hollow) that started around SW 17th and Jefferson and carried the waters of Tanner Creek into Couch Lake (now the site of Old Town/Chinatown and the Pearl District). Over a century ago, Tanner Creek was buried  underground (where it still drains the West Hills), and the Tanner Creek Gulch was infilled. Thus, the only remaining part of the hollow is the ravine (Tanner Creek Canyon) carved out by Tanner Creek through which The Sunset Highway carrying US-26 passes and which the Vista Bridge spans (also called the Vista Viaduct).

The historically important Canyon Road connects to Jefferson Street underneath the Vista Bridge and was also called "The Great Plank Road." Canyon Road passed through Tanner Creek Canyon, which is how the road acquired its name. However, in the 1960s the section of Canyon Road that passes through the canyon was elevated (infilled with excavated dirt from Interstate 405's construction) and is now just a section of Highway 26. The Goose Hollow name had gone out of common usage for several decades until former mayor Bud Clark named his pub The Goose Hollow Inn in 1967 in an effort to "rekindle civic regard for the neighborhood." Clark resided in the Goose Hollow neighborhood.

Famous residents have included: Daniel H. Lownsdale, Charles Erskine Scott Wood, Congresswoman Nan Wood Honeyman, Erskine Wood, Dr. Marie Equi, John Reed, Abigail Scott Duniway, Julius Meier, Dr. Lendon Smith, Pietro Belluschi, Minor White, Milton Wilson, Chuck Palahniuk, former Mayor Bud Clark, Ken Shores, George Johanson, and Jean Auel.

Location
Goose Hollow is adjacent to Downtown Portland, Arlington Heights, the Pearl District, the Hillside neighborhood, Northwest District and Washington Park. Providence Park, the Multnomah Athletic Club, and Lincoln High School, the oldest high school in the Pacific Northwest, are located in Goose Hollow.

Areas included within the Goose Hollow neighborhood are King's Hill, Vista Ridge, Gander Ridge, and the adjacent flats near the path of Tanner Creek. King's Hill is separated from Vista Ridge by the Tanner Creek Canyon spanned by the Vista Bridge. Vista Ridge (where the Vista Ridge Tunnels are located) is separated from Gander Ridge by Cable Car Canyon. From 1890 to 1905 a steep and enormous trestle bridge passed through this canyon, carrying cable cars up to Portland Heights. The neighborhood boundaries range (north/south) from Burnside Street to the low slopes of the West Hills (officially known as the Tualatin Mountains) and (east/west) from I-405 to Washington Park.

Points of interest
The MAX Light Rail system travels through the neighborhood, stopping at Providence Park and Goose Hollow/SW Jefferson St stations.  Goose Hollow is also served by two major freeways: Interstate 405 (which divides it from Downtown Portland) and U.S. Route 26 (which passes under and through part of the neighborhood through the Vista Ridge Tunnels).

The Goose Hollow Inn, a tavern on SW Jefferson, was owned by former mayor Bud Clark.

Opening scenes for the 2004 film What the Bleep Do We Know!? were filmed in Goose Hollow and included views of the Vista Bridge and the Goose Hollow/SW Jefferson St (MAX station). In 2010, the title shot for Portlandia was photographed from Goose Hollow's Vista Bridge.

Buildings
 Civic Tower (Portland, Oregon) - 1926 West Burnside St.

Notes

References

External links

 Map, Goose Hollow neighborhood association
 Guide to Goose Hollow Neighborhood (PortlandNeighborhood.com)
 Jefferson Street Property -  natural area, acquired by Portland Parks & Recreation in 1995
 Goose Hollow Light Rail Station Community: Urban Design Plan and Comprehensive Plan (PDF maps, 1996)
Goose Hollow Street Tree Inventory Report

 
Neighborhoods in Portland, Oregon